Salute! is Italian satellite television channel, owned by Eurodigital and broadcast by Rai International, free to air on Hot Bird 6 13°E. It is also scheduled to be broadcast in North America and Australia.

The programming is devoted to medicine, nutrition, beauty treatments and well-being issues.

Free-to-air
Television channels and stations established in 2009
Italian-language television stations
Television channels in Italy